Gare de Cherbourg is the railway station of the city of Cherbourg, Normandy, France. It is the western terminus of the Mantes-la-Jolie–Cherbourg railway.

History
On 5 September 1850, the president Louis-Napoléon Bonaparte visited Cherbourg and demanded the continuation of work on the Arsenal. He also demanded the construction of a railway line linking Cherbourg to Paris. The construction of the line was approved in 1852. The station was opened on 4 August 1858 by Napoleon III who arrived on the imperial train from Paris.

At the time of opening, the trip to Paris took ten hours and cost 22.85 FrF for a third class ticket and 41.55 FrF for a first class ticket.

Queen Victoria visited the city and its station the same day and took part in the grandiose celebrations. The third dock of the Cherbourg Arsenal, 1 200 000m³ in size, was opened and a steam ship immediately sailed from it.

At the end of the day, a statue of Napoleon I on a horse by Armand Le Véel was unveiled.

Services
Cherbourg station is served by regional trains to Lison, Caen and Paris.

References

External links
 

Railway stations in Manche
Railway stations in France opened in 1858